Tan Sri Eric Chia Eng Hock was a prominent Malaysian businessman. He died of a heart attack in Sungai Petani, Kedah, aged 74.

Eric Chia and Lim Guan Eng
On 11 April 1996, Lim Guan Eng had lodged, at the Sentul police headquarters, a police report titled "First Report On Financial Malpractices, Abuse Of Power, Corruption And Fraud in Perwaja Terengganu Sdn Bhd (Perwaja).”

On 2 January 2002, Chia filed a defamation suit against Lim, claiming that Lim had pictured him as corrupt and not qualified to serve the company. In his statement of claim he said the report had severely damaged his reputation as a well-known businessman and sought general and aggravated damages and other relief deemed fit by the court.

On 1 March 2002, Lim entered his statement of defence stating that he relied on qualified privilege.

On 22 April 2009, Jega Kumar & Associates filed a notice of discontinuance of Chia's suit.

On 27 April 2009, almost a year after Chia died, High Court Deputy Registrar, Norazlin Othman, in chambers, granted the application by counsel for the late Tan Sri Eric Chia Eng Hock to withdraw a defamation suit against DAP secretary-general Lim Guan Eng.

Honour

Honour of Malaysia
  :
 Commander of the Order of Loyalty to the Crown of Malaysia (P.S.M.) – Tan Sri (1989)
 :
 Knight Commander of the Order of the Life of the Crown of Kelantan (D.J.M.K.) – Dato' (1986)
 Knight Grand Commander of the Order of the Life of the Crown of Kelantan (S.J.M.K.) – Dato' (1991)
 :
 Knight Grand Commander of the Order of the Crown of Terengganu (S.P.M.T.) – Dato' (1990)
 Member Grand Companion of the Order of Sultan Mahmud I of Terengganu (S.S.M.T.) – Dato' Seri (1991)

References

1930s births
2008 deaths
Malaysian people of Chinese descent
20th-century Malaysian businesspeople
Commanders of the Order of Loyalty to the Crown of Malaysia
Knights Grand Commander of the Order of the Crown of Terengganu